is a quasi-national park in Japan. The park covers the Hida River from Gero to Minokamo in Gifu Prefecture; it also covers the middle reaches of the Kiso River from Mizunami, Gifu Prefecture, to Inuyama, Aichi Prefecture. It was designated a quasi-national park in March 1964.

You also may find Wisteria, Metasequoia and Rhododendron among the plants and flowers in the national park.

Area communities
The park covers the below communities. The bulk of the park's area is within Gifu Prefecture. (Only  is within the borders of Aichi Prefecture.)

Gifu Prefecture
Kakamigahara, Mizunami, Minokamo, Ena, Sakahogi, Yaotsu, Kawabe, Hichisō, Shirakawa, Mitake
Aichi Prefecture
Inuyama

See also
List of national parks of Japan

References

National parks of Japan
Parks and gardens in Gifu Prefecture
Parks in Aichi Prefecture
Protected areas established in 1964